The Turbot Bank is a shelf bank and mound feature of the seabed of the North Sea that lies off the east coast of Scotland, about  east of Peterhead. The depth of water above the bank varies from 60 m below sea level on top of the bank down to 80 m at its margins. It has been designated as a Nature Conservation Marine Protected Area since 2014.

It is an important habitat for sand eels, small fish of various species that are eaten by seabirds such as Atlantic puffin (Fratercula arctica) and black-legged kittiwake (Rissa tridactyla), as well as fish such as plaice (Pleuronectes platessa) and marine mammals such as dolphins. The bank is particularly associated with Raitt's sand eel (Ammodytes marinus), which live buried in the sand of the bank for months at a time.

See also
Firth of Forth Banks Complex

References

External links
Turbot Bank Site Summary Document – Joint Nature Conservation Committee

Nature Conservation Marine Protected Areas of Scotland
Sandbanks of the North Sea
Geology of Scotland